Predrag Jurić (born 4 November 1961) is a Bosnia and Herzegovina-born Croatian retired association footballer.

International career
He made his debut for Yugoslavia in a November 1986 European Championship qualification match away against England and has earned a total of 2 caps, scoring no goals. His second and final international was a December 1987 European Championship qualification match against Turkey.

Managerial career
In May 2001, Jurić was dismissed as manager by Hrvatski Dragovoljac and he was replaced by Miljenko Dovečer as manager of Međimurje in March 2005 After 15 years without coaching, he took charge at Jarun Zagreb in summer 2020, but had to resign in March 2021 due to health issues. He was replaced at Jarun by Denis Bezer.

References

External links

 http://www.lfp.es/historico/primera/plantillas/historial.asp?jug=5593
 http://www.bdfutbol.com/j/j2204.html

1961 births
Living people
People from Čitluk, Bosnia and Herzegovina
Croats of Bosnia and Herzegovina
Association football forwards
Yugoslav footballers
Yugoslavia international footballers
Bosnia and Herzegovina footballers
FK Velež Mostar players
NK GOŠK Dubrovnik players
GNK Dinamo Zagreb players
Real Burgos CF footballers
CA Marbella footballers
CP Mérida footballers
NK Hrvatski Dragovoljac players
Yugoslav First League players
Yugoslav Second League players
Segunda División players
La Liga players
Croatian Football League players
Yugoslav expatriate footballers
Bosnia and Herzegovina expatriate footballers
Expatriate footballers in Spain
Yugoslav expatriate sportspeople in Spain
Bosnia and Herzegovina expatriate sportspeople in Spain
Expatriate footballers in Croatia
Bosnia and Herzegovina expatriate sportspeople in Croatia
Croatian football managers
NK Hrvatski Dragovoljac managers
NK Međimurje managers
NK Zadar managers